David Škoch and Igor Zelenay were the defending champions, but they chose to not compete this year.
Grigor Dimitrov and Teymuraz Gabashvili defeated Jan Minář and Lukáš Rosol 6–4, 2–6, [10–8] in the final.

Seeds

Draw

Draw

References
 Doubles Draw

ATP Challenger Trophy - Doubles
2009 Doubles